Oklahoma City University (OCU) is a private university historically affiliated with the United Methodist Church and located in Oklahoma City, Oklahoma.

The university offers undergraduate bachelor's degrees, graduate master's degrees and doctoral degrees, organized into eight colleges and schools and one Methodist seminary. Students can major in more than 70 undergraduate majors, 20 graduate degrees, including a JD, MBA, MFA, and PhD in Nursing, and an Adult Studies Program for working adults to earn a Bachelor of Science or Bachelor of Arts degree. The university has approximately 3,000 students, including 1,200 graduate students. The official school and athletic colors are blue and white.

History

Early history

Oklahoma City University began as Epworth University by local developer Anton Classen in the early 1900s. Classen was looking to begin a Methodist university in conjunction with other development projects he worked on. Construction of the school began in 1902 and it opened in 1904 with 100 students. Anton Classen was heavily involved with development of early Oklahoma City and advanced the idea of a Methodist university in Oklahoma and helped spark the ideas of the Methodist Church to establish a Methodist university in Oklahoma. Construction began in 1902 and classes started in 1904 with enrollment growing by almost 100 students during that first year.

Epworth closed in 1911 after the school ran into financial difficulties. At the same time the church formed Methodist University of Oklahoma in Guthrie, Oklahoma, which also absorbed a Methodist college in Texas, Fort Worth University. After a few years the school's trustees developed a plan to close the school in Guthrie and relocate to Oklahoma City. The school opened in Oklahoma City as Oklahoma City College in 1919 from funding from the Methodist congregations. After the college opened it experienced rapid growth and changed its name to Oklahoma City University in 1924. Despite the success and growth of the university in the 1920s, OCU again fell on hard times during the Great Depression.

Post-war era
Dr. Cluster Smith became president of Oklahoma City University after the Great Depression. At the same time the United States entered World War II creating new challenges for the university, especially the university's mounting debt and need for new facilities. The War created a decline in the student body, especially in males who left school to enlist in the military. By 1942 the  student body was 75 percent female. This created a shortage of players and funds causing many of the athletic programs, such as the football team, to end operations. Following the war enrollment increased dramatically and the university began a period of rapid development through the remainder of the 1940s. In the 1950s OCU received accreditation from the North Central Association of Colleges and Secondary Schools. The university then took control of the Oklahoma City College of Law and began a partnership with the Massachusetts Institute of Technology to elevate the academics and the quality of education. The Bishop W. Angie Smith Chapel was dedicated in 1968 as part of a plan to expand OCU's spiritual life.

In the mid-1970s, after nearly 25 years of steady growth, the university again fell on hard times. In 1976 United Methodist Bishop Paul Milhouse discussed the school's issues to the Annual Conference of Oklahoma United Methodist churches in Tulsa.  After requesting that people direct their prayers and pledges to the university, by 1980 the Methodist Church had raised more than $3 million. Jerald Walker, an OCU alumnus, became president in 1979 and continued the university's growth stemming from the financial support from the Church. During his tenure as president facilities were improved, new academic programs were started and enrollment increased again. In 1981 it was announced that the university was out of debt and turned a surplus for the first time since 1975. The university added the School of Religion and the nursing program during the 1980s.

Recent history
In the 1990s the university upgraded and renovated campus facilities. Stephen Jennings became president in 1998 and began focusing on the university's centennial celebration and position the university for the future. Under Jennings the athletic name was changed from the Chiefs to the Stars and the university expanded student life, including the Distinguished Speakers Series. Tom McDaniel became president in 2001 and drastically altered the look of the OCU campus from an influx of donations. New additions to the campus included The Ann Lacy Visitor and Admissions Center, the Norick Art Center, the Edith Kinney Gaylord Center, the Wanda L. Bass School of Music, Meinders School of Business, and a new residence hall. Robert Harlan Henry, chief judge of the United States Court of Appeals for the Tenth Circuit, became the university's 17th president in July 2010, succeeding Tom McDaniel. During Henry's tenure, the university has moved the OCU School of Law to an historic location in downtown Oklahoma City, renovated several academic facilities, and launched a Physician Assistant program.

Historic designation

On December 19, 1978, part of the university campus was listed as a historic district on the National Register of Historic Places. The district comprises the Administration Building, the Fine Arts Building, and the Goldstar Building. It was nominated for its statewide significance in education and in the Methodist community.

Campus
The  campus lies in the Uptown area of central Oklahoma City north of downtown and immediately west of the Asia District, just a few miles due west of the Oklahoma State Capitol building on NW 23rd Street. Other notable districts nearby include the Plaza District, the Paseo Arts District, and the LGBT district.

Prominent campus buildings include the Gold Star Memorial Building (School of Religion, Honors College, School of Theater ), Clara Jones Administration Building, Bishop W. Angie Smith Chapel, Sarkeys Science and Mathematics Center, Edith Kinney Gaylord Center (housing the Ann Lacy School of American Dance and Entertainment), Kirkpatrick Fine Arts Building, Dulaney-Browne Library, McDaniel University Center, Meinders School of Business and Henry K. Freede Wellness and Activity Center. The 38 million dollar state-of-the-art  Wanda L. Bass Music Center was opened in April 2006. OCU opened a  addition to the Kramer School of Nursing in January 2011. The university purchased the historic Central High School building in downtown Oklahoma City in 2012 where the School of Law is now located.

The Kerr-McGee Centennial Plaza on the southeast corner of the campus was constructed in 2004 to celebrate the 100th anniversary of OCU. The plaza features bronze statues honoring OCU's three Miss America pageant winners. In the first decade of the 21st century, OCU completed more than $100 million in new campus construction.

Housing
Housing options on the campus of Oklahoma City University include dormitories, the Greek system for men, and on-campus apartments.

Oklahoma United Methodist Hall (formerly Centennial Hall) is a coed facility for freshmen and upper-class students, and includes an underground parking structure. Banning Hall provides coed housing for freshmen and upper-class honors students. Walker Hall, OCU's only high-rise dorm at seven stories, offers coed housing for freshmen. Draper Hall is a coed dorm for upperclassman and freshmen overflow, featuring suite style rooms.

There is one apartment complex on campus available to upperclass students only. Cokesbury Court offers residential hall-type living in separate apartment units.

In addition to on-campus residences there are a wide variety of off-campus options nearby ranging from boarding houses and flats in the Asia District, Gatewood neighborhood, and on 39th Street, to apartment complexes and rental bungalows in Uptown and the Plaza District. A number of students live in the two fraternity houses located just off-campus.

Campus safety
OCU maintains a full-time on-campus police force to ensure a safe campus.  In addition to normal duties and patrols, OCUPD are available to escort any student after dark. In addition, emergency call stations are strategically scattered throughout the campus providing immediate access to campus security.

Academics

The university is classified as a Master's college and university by the Carnegie Classification of Institutions of Higher Education. OCU is the only Oklahoma institution listed in the top tier of the master level university category by U.S. News & World Report magazine's "America's Best Colleges" issue. It is currently ranked 23rd among Master's Universities in the West region.

OCU is accredited by the Higher Learning Commission. In addition the nursing program is accredited by the National League for Nursing Accrediting Commission, the music program is accredited by the National Association of Schools of Music, the Montessori education program accredited by the Montessori Accreditation Council for Teacher Education, and the law school is accredited by the American Bar Association.

Colleges and schools by size
 Petree College of Arts & Sciences
 Meinders School of Business
 School of Law
 Kramer School of Nursing
 Wanda L. Bass School of Music
 School of Theatre
 Ann Lacy School of American Dance and Entertainment
 Wimberly School of Religion

Seminary
 Saint Paul School of Theology, headquartered in Kansas City, Mo., offers courses on the Oklahoma City University campus.

Degree programs
OCU offers more than 70 undergraduate majors; 20 graduate degrees, including the MBA, the J.D., the MFA, two PhD programs in nursing, and the Adult Studies Program for working adults to earn a Bachelor of Science or Bachelor of Arts degree. The school also offers numerous pre-professional degrees, one such degree track is the Oxford Plan; successful participants qualify for preferred admission to the School of Law and participants with an LSAT score of 155 or higher and an undergraduate GPA of 3.5 or higher are guaranteed admission to the School of Law. In 2009 OCU launched its first doctoral programs in the university's history. OCU offers a Doctor of Nursing Practice and the PhD in Nursing through the Kramer School of Nursing.

OCU also provides opportunities for further education with service learning components across the curriculum; a University Honors Program; OCULEADS, a freshman scholarship and leadership development program; a partnership with The Oklahoma Scholar-Leadership Enrichment Program (OSLEP), an intercollegiate, interdisciplinary program; a Center for Interpersonal Studies through Film and Literature; and numerous study abroad programs.

Athletics

The Oklahoma City (OCU) athletic teams are called the Stars (formerly known the Methodists prior to 1921, as the Goldbugs prior to 1944, and the Chiefs from 1944 until 1999.). The university is a member of the National Association of Intercollegiate Athletics (NAIA), primarily competing in the Sooner Athletic Conference (SAC) for most of its sports since the 1986–87 academic year. The Stars previously competed at the NCAA Division I ranks, primarily competing in the Midwestern City Conference (MCC; now known as the Horizon League) from 1979–80 to 1984–85; and in the D-I Trans America Athletic Conference (TAAC; now known as the Atlantic Sun Conference) during the 1978–79 school year. Its women's wrestling team competed in the Women's College Wrestling Association (WCWA).

OCU competes in 18 intercollegiate varsity sports: Men's sports include baseball, basketball, cross country, golf, soccer, track & field and wrestling; while women's sports include basketball, cross country, golf, soccer, softball, stunt, track & field and volleyball; and co-ed sports include competitive cheer, competitive dance and rowing. Former sports included women's wrestling.

Overview
Under president Tom McDaniel the number of athletic teams doubled to 22. OCU is represented by "Starsky" the Ram; "Starsky" is inspired by the celestial lore surrounding the creation of OCU. OCU teams have won 57 National Championships since 1988, most recently repeating as the 2014 NAIA Men's Cross Country Champions.  This marks the 20th straight year that OCU has won a National Championship.

Men's basketball
A member of the NCAA until after the 1984–85 season, OCU made the NCAA Men's Division I Basketball Championship tournament 11 times and the National Invitation Tournament twice as an independent, making OCU the most successful basketball program to no longer compete at the Division I level. Its basketball tradition spans the glory days of legendary coaches Abe Lemons, Paul Hansen, and Doyle Parrack. OCU has been ranked in the top 10 in the NACDA Director's Cup rankings consistently since 1997, including a top finish in 2001–02.

Baseball
In 1984–85 OCU won the Midwestern City Conference baseball championship and made into the NCAA Division I Baseball Championship tournament before moving to the NAIA the next year.

Wrestling
In 2012, Kevin Patrick Hardy (Class of 2013), became OCU's first national champion in wrestling, capturing the national title at 165 pounds.

Student life
Opportunities for cultural enrichment and entertainment on the OCU campus include concerts, play performances, operas, films, sporting events, and seminars by world-renowned speakers and business leaders. Guest speakers at OCU have included Archbishop Desmond Tutu, Nobel prize winner Elie Wiesel, author Kurt Vonnegut, playwright Edward Albee, researcher Jane Goodall, Rabbi Harold Kushner, Sister Helen Prejean, educator and author Jonathan Kozol, Poets Laureate Ted Kooser and Billy Collins, civil rights attorney Morris Dees, journalists Helen Thomas and George Will, U.S. Supreme Court Justice Sandra Day O'Connor, environmental activist Robert F. Kennedy Jr. and politician Karen Hughes.

A Wellness Program and Outdoor Adventures Program provide numerous opportunities for student activity such as pilates, yoga, traditional aerobics classes and self-defense, as well as hiking, bicycling, camping, horseback riding and sailing.  A resource center and gear checkout are provided on campus.  Intramural sports are a popular activity, with over 35 different sports available in league and tournament play and both coed and single-gender teams. Students have access to a full-size exercise facility, the Aduddell Center, located next to Centennial Hall.
 
The university's high number of international students add to a culture of diversity. The Office of Multicultural Affairs maintains organizations such as the Black Student Association, Hispanic Student Association, Native American Society, and the Asian American Student Association. The office also maintains foreign student associations such as the Indian Student Association, Korean Student Association, and Chinese Student Association.

The student body is represented by the Student Government Association, or SGA (formerly Student Senate). The OCU SGA consists of the Executive Branch, which includes the president and his staff and manages SGA; the Student Senate, which allots monies to student organizations and hears legislation; the Student Activities Committee, which oversees Homecoming and special events; the Judicial Branch, which deal with student disciplinary issues. The elections for SGA are held in April with special elections for freshman in the fall.

Oklahoma City University has nearly 60 active student organizations. Focuses of these organizations range from ethnic to political, religious to special interests. Organizations often have office space inside the Student Government Association Office in the Union. The list below is only a selection of campus organizations.

The Oklahoma City University Film Institute offers the campus and Oklahoma City community the opportunity to view eight to ten classic international films per year. Written materials on the theme and films is available at each screening and the screenings are followed by a discussion of the film. The film series has been presented each year since 1982.

Traditions
OCU maintains several traditions, the largest being Homecoming in the fall. Homecoming, which is a week-long celebration, includes philanthropy events, concerts, floats and sporting events.

Newspapers, magazines and other media
The Campus is the official student newspaper of Oklahoma City University. It is updated at MediaOCU.com. It has served the students since 1907, and has won numerous state and national awards. It is produced by Student Publications, a part of the school's mass communications department.

The Scarab is a student anthology of writing and art, including non-fiction, fiction, poetry, and photography, published by OCU's chapter of the international English honor society Sigma Tau Delta and winner of the society's 2003–2004 award for Literary Arts Journal of the year.

All students may also submit research to the undergraduate research journal Stellar.

Greek life
The university is home to three fraternities and four sororities including Alpha Chi Omega, Alpha Phi, Gamma Phi Beta, Phi Mu sororities; Kappa Sigma, Lambda Chi Alpha, Phi Gamma Delta fraternities. OCU is also home to many other non-traditional Greek organizations such as two National Interfraternity Music Council organizations, Sigma Alpha Iota and Phi Mu Alpha Sinfonia; One local Christian fraternity, Delta Alpha Chi; and Kappa Phi, a national Christian women's organization. OCU also has numerous chapters of professional and academic honor fraternities such as Phi Alpha Delta, a professional law fraternity; Sigma Tau Delta, the international English honor society; and the original chapter of Beta Beta Beta, the national biological honor society.

Notable people

Faculty

More than 78 percent of OCU faculty members hold terminal degrees in their fields. All classes are taught by professors, and not graduate assistants. Student to faculty ratio is 13:1 and the average class size is 16 for freshmen and 12 for upperclassmen. Notable faculty have included:

 Florence Birdwell, the late professor emerita of voice
 Jerod Impichchaachaaha' Tate, classical composer and pianist
 Edward Knight, composer and Professor of Music/Composer in Residence at the Wanda L. Bass School of Music
 Charles W. Mooney Jr., later the Charles A. Heimbold, Jr. Professor of Law, and interim Dean, at the University of Pennsylvania Law School
 Robin Meyers, author, Christian minister, peace activist and Distinguished Professor of Social Justice in the Philosophy Department
 Sergio Monteiro, acclaimed pianist and Director of Piano at the Wanda L. Bass School of Music
 Jim Roth, current dean of the Oklahoma City University School of Law, former member of the Oklahoma Corporation Commission and the first ever openly LGBT person to hold a statewide elected office in Oklahoma.

Alumni

Arts, entertainment and letters
 Eric Manuel College basketball player, 2-time NAIA national champion (1990–91 and 1991–92)
 Sarah Coburn '94 – Operatic soprano for the Metropolitan Opera of New York City
 Kristin Chenoweth '90 – Tony Award and Emmy Award-winning actress, known for her roles in Wicked, The Pink Panther (2006 film) and You're a Good Man, Charlie Brown
 Stephen Dickson '73 – Operatic baritone for Metropolitan Opera, New York City Opera, San Francisco Opera and other opera companies
 Chris Harrison '93 BA Mass Comm – TV personality, host of The Bachelor
 Rana Husseini '90 BA, '93 MLA Award-winning journalist and human rights activist
 Jane Jayroe '68 – Miss America of 1967
 William Johns '61, opera singer
 Marquita Lister '85 – Operatic soprano for the Houston Grand Opera
 Stacey Logan '85 – Broadway actress most famous for role in Beauty and the Beast
 William Harjo LoneFight '91 – noted Native American author and expert in revitalization of Native American languages and cultural traditions
 Chris Merritt '74 – Grammy Award-nominated operatic tenor
 Leona Mitchell '70 – operatic soprano for the Metropolitan Opera of New York City and Music Hall of Fame inductee
 April Nelson 2014 – Miss Louisiana 2015- 3rd runner-up to Miss America
 Cathy O'Donnell '45 – actress most famous for her roles in They Live by Night, The Man from Laramie and Detective Story
 Kelli O'Hara '98 – Seven-time Tony Award nominated actress, Tony Award winner for her role in The King & I
 Susan Powell '84 – Miss America of 1981
 Shawntel Smith '00 – Miss America of 1996
 W. Stephen Smith, '81 MPA – voice teacher and author, Northwestern University Professor of Voice and Opera
 Gerald Steichen '86 – New York City Opera conductor for Cats and The Phantom of the Opera
 Lara Teeter '76 – Tony Award-nominated actor, theatre director, professor
 Mason Williams '58 – Grammy and  Emmy Award-winning composer, writer; creator of "Classical Gas"

Business and academics
 Craig Groeschel '91 – founder and senior pastor of Life.Church
 Checkley Sin - MBA - film producer and 2022 candidate for Chief Executive of Hong Kong

Military
 Edmond Harjo – Seminole Nation of Oklahoma Code Talker during World War II, 2013 recipient of the Congressional Gold Medal
 David L. Goldfein – 21st Air Force Chief of Staff

Sports
 John Barfield – former MLB pitcher for the Texas Rangers
 Susie Berning – professional golfer on the LPGA tour with 4 major wins, and 12 total wins
 Joseph Bisenius '04 – MLB pitcher for the Philadelphia Phillies
 Dino Delevski – former professional soccer player for the Kansas City Comets
 Gary Gray – former NBA guard for the Cincinnati Royals
 Gary Hill — former NBA guard for the San Francisco Warriors
 Curtis Haywood – NBA basketball player for the Toronto Raptors
 Bud Koper '64 – former NBA player and All-American basketball player
 Abe Lemons '49 – former basketball coach for Oklahoma City University and the University of Texas at Austin, amassed 599 wins and 13 NCAA tournament bids
 Allen Leavell '79 – former NBA guard for the Houston Rockets
 Taiwo Rafiu '94 – women's basketball Olympian for Nigeria
 Hub Reed '58 – former NBA center for the Los Angeles Lakers and Detroit Pistons
 Freddy Sanchez – MLB infielder for the San Francisco Giants and 2006 National League batting champion
 Ralph Schilling '41 – former NFL player for the Washington Redskins
 Chris Schroder '01 – MLB pitcher for the Florida Marlins
 Arnold Short '54 - NCAA All-American and '55 AAU All-American basketball player Phillips 66ers
 Dave Simmons - former NBL basketball player, father of NBA player Ben Simmons
 Chas Skelly – NAIA All-American wrestler; professional Mixed Martial Artist, current Featherweight in the UFC
 Dick Stone '34 – former MLB pitcher for the Washington Senators
 Harry Vines '61 – former director of USA Basketball
 Buzz Williams '94 – head men's basketball coach for Texas A&M

Politics and law
 Hannah Atkins '86 – Oklahoma Secretary of State 1987–1991
 Deborah Barnes '83 – Judge, Oklahoma Court of Civil Appeals 2008–present
 Michael D. Brown '81 – First Director and Administrator of Federal Emergency Management Agency (FEMA) 2003–2005
 Jeff Cloud '91 – Commissioner of the Oklahoma Corporation Commission
 Brandon Creighton J. D. – Member of the Texas Senate 2014–present
 Mickey Edwards '69 – Served eight terms in United States House of Representatives, author, political commentator, professor
 Enoch Kelly Haney '64 – Principal Chief of the Seminole Nation of Oklahoma
 Carol Hansen '74 – Judge, Oklahoma Court of Civil Appeals 1985–present
 Elizabeth A. Hayden '80 – District Judge for Stearns County, Minnesota 1986–present
 David Holt (politician) '09 – Mayor of Oklahoma City 2018–present
 Ernest Istook '76 – Served seven terms in United States House of Representatives, 2006 Oklahoma Republican gubernatorial nominee
 Yvonne Kauger '69 – Justice, Supreme Court of Oklahoma
 Steven T. Kuykendall '68 – member of the United States Congress representing California's 36th congressional district 1999–2001
 Todd Lamb '05 – Oklahoma Lieutenant Governor 2011–2019, Majority leader of the Oklahoma State Senate 2004–2011
 Keith Leftwich – member of the  Oklahoma State Senate 1982–1989
 Richard Lerblance '79 – Senator from District 7 of the Oklahoma State Senate
 Tim Moore '95 – Speaker of the House, North Carolina General Assembly 2015–present
 Johnston Murray '46 – Governor, State of Oklahoma 1951–1955
 Kenneth Nance – lawyer, lobbyist, member of Oklahoma House of Representatives
 Marian P. Opala '53- Justice, Supreme Court of Oklahoma 1978–2010
 Leon C. Phillips '16 – 11th Governor of Oklahoma
 Jim Roth '94 – Dean, OCU School of Law, 2018–present, Oklahoma Corporation Commissioner 2007–2009
 James R. Winchester '77 – Chief Justice, Supreme Court of Oklahoma 2007–2009

References

Bibliography

External links
 
 Official athletics website

 
Educational institutions established in 1904
Private universities and colleges in Oklahoma
School buildings on the National Register of Historic Places in Oklahoma
Sooner Athletic Conference
Private universities in Oklahoma
Universities and colleges in Oklahoma City
Methodist universities and colleges in the United States
Historic districts on the National Register of Historic Places in Oklahoma
National Register of Historic Places in Oklahoma City
1904 establishments in Oklahoma Territory